The U.S. Senate Environment and Public Works Subcommittee on Water and Wildlife is one of four subcommittees of the U.S. Senate Committee on Environment and Public Works.

Jurisdiction
Fish and Wildlife Issues
 U.S. Fish and Wildlife Service
 National Wildlife Refuges
 Endangered Species Act (ESA)
 Lacey Act
 Pittman-Robertson Federal Aid in Wildlife Restoration Act (Pittman-Robertson)
 Coastal Barrier Resources Act
 Invasive Species
 Sportsmen’s issues
 Fisheries and wildlife
Water Issues
 Clean Water Act, including wetlands
 Safe Drinking Water Act
 Ocean dumping
 Water pollution
 Environmental aspects of Outer Continental Shelf Lands

Members, 117th Congress

External links
Official Subcommittee page

Environment and Public Works Senate Water and Wildlife